The Australia and New Zealand Unitarian Universalist Association  or ANZUUA is a Unitarian Universalist organisation which serves as the organising body for Unitarian and Universalist congregations in Australia and New Zealand. ANZUUA was established in 1974 as the Australia and New Zealand Unitarian Association.

ANZUUA is also a member of the International Council of Unitarians and Universalists.

Congregations 
ANZUA has member congregations in:
 Adelaide
 Auckland
 Blenheim
 Brisbane
 Canberra
 Christchurch
 Melbourne
 Nelson
 Perth
 Sydney
 Wellington

External links
 

Unitarian Universalist organizations
Religion in Australia
Religion in New Zealand
Religious organizations established in 1974